The 2008–09 Women's EHF Cup was the 28th edition of the competition, taking place from 8 September 2008 to 17 May 2009. SD Itxako defeated HC Leipzig in the final to become the second Spanish club to win the competition.

Second Qualifying Round

Second Qualifying Round

Round of 32

Round of 16

Quarter-finals

Semifinals

Final

Top goalscorers

References

Women's EHF Cup
EHF Cup women
EHF Cup women